Artem Smoliar (born 4 February 1985) is a Russian male volleyball player. He is part of the Russia men's national volleyball team. On club level he plays for Belogorie.

References

External links
 Artem Smoliar at the International Volleyball Federation
 

1985 births
Living people
Russian men's volleyball players
Place of birth missing (living people)
 Burevisnyk-ShVSM Chernihiv players